Yuttana Chaiyakaew (born February 26, 1981) is a professional footballer from Thailand. He currently plays for Pattani in the Thai League 4.

He played for Krung Thai Bank in the 2008 AFC Champions League group stages.

References

External links
 Goal.com 
 Players Profile - info.thscore.com
 

Chaikaew, Yuttana
Chaikaew, Yuttana
Yuttana Chaikaew
Yuttana Chaikaew
Chaikaew, Yuttana
Yuttana Chaikaew
Yuttana Chaikaew
Yuttana Chaikaew
Yuttana Chaikaew
Yuttana Chaikaew
Yuttana Chaikaew
Yuttana Chaikaew
Yuttana Chaikaew
Yuttana Chaikaew